The 2019 Colonial Athletic Association baseball tournament was held at Eagle Field at Veterans Memorial Park in Harrisonburg, Virginia, from May 22 through 25.  The winner of the tournament, earned the Colonial Athletic Association's automatic bid to the 2019 NCAA Division I baseball tournament.

Entering the event, defending champion UNC Wilmington had won the most championships among active teams, with five.  James Madison and William & Mary had claimed two titles, while College of Charleston, Delaware, and Towson each had one.  Former member East Carolina won 7 titles during their tenure in the conference.

Seeding and format
Continuing the format adopted in 2012, the top six finishers from the regular season competed in the modified double-elimination tournament.

Bracket

Conference championship

All-Tournament Team
The following players were named to the All-Tournament Team.

Most Valuable Player
Greg Jones was named Tournament Most Valuable Player.  Weiss was a shortstop for UNC Wilmington.

References

Tournament
Colonial Athletic Association Baseball Tournament
Colonial Athletic Association baseball tournament
Colonial Athletic Association baseball tournament
Baseball in Virginia
College sports in Virginia
Sports competitions in Virginia
Tourist attractions in Harrisonburg, Virginia